Béla Nagy, a Hungarian independent researcher, specialized in the seasonal killifish genus Nothobranchius, as well as members of the family Procatopodidae within the order Cyprinodontiformes.

Taxon names authored
 Lacustricola margaritatus , 2022
 Lacustricola nitidus , 2020
 Lacustricola petnehazyi , 2018)
 Nothobranchius albertinensis , 2020
 Nothobranchius angelae , 2019
 Nothobranchius attenboroughi , 2020
 Nothobranchius chochamandai , 2014
 Nothobranchius cooperi , 2017
 Nothobranchius ditte , 2018 
Nothobranchius elucens , 2021
 Nothobranchius flagrans , 2014 
 Nothobranchius hoermanni , 2020
 Nothobranchius itigiensis , 2020
 Nothobranchius matanduensis , 2020
 Nothobranchius milvertzi , 2014
 Nothobranchius moameensis , 2020
 Nothobranchius nikiforovi , 2021
 Nothobranchius ottoschmidti , 2019
 Nothobranchius rungwaensis  , 2019
 Nothobranchius sainthousei , 2016
 Nothobranchius skeltoni  , 2019
 Nothobranchius sonjae  , 2019
 Nothobranchius taiti , 2019
 Nothobranchius venustus , 2020

References

Links
 WildNothos Photographs by Béla Nagy 
 Béla Nagy. ResearchGate.

Ichthyologists
Hungarian people